Parliamentary elections were held in Georgia on 2 November 2003 alongside a constitutional referendum. According to statistics released by the Georgian Election Commission, the elections were won by a combination of parties supporting President Eduard Shevardnadze.

However, the results were annulled by the Georgia Supreme Court after the Rose Revolution on 25 November, following allegations of widespread electoral fraud and large public protests which led to the resignation of Shevardnadze. Fresh elections were held on 28 March 2004.

Parties
"For a New Georgia" was the electoral bloc that supported President Eduard Shevardnadze. The Revival Party was an ally of Shevardnadze. The National Movement (NM) was the party of opposition leader Mikhail Saakashvili.

Conduct
Reports of violence, voter intimidation and ballot box stuffing began coming in shortly after the polling stations opened. The biggest problem, however, was the voter lists prepared by the Georgian government. 
Mikhail Saakashvili was among tens of thousands who were denied the right to vote. His name, along with names of many thousands across the country, was missing from the voter list prepared by the Georgian government. Entire neighborhoods were mysteriously removed from the voter list in the areas where opposition was likely to do well.

Georgian analysts described the vote as "the messiest and most chaotic election" the country has ever had. 
"The government did everything to make this election chaotic. I think there were also (those in) government (who) did not want this election to be orderly because they knew they would lose it," said Ghia Nodia of the Caucasus Institute for Democracy and Development.

An international mission from the Organization for Security and Cooperation in Europe (OSCE) declared that the election fell short of international standards. 
"These elections have, regrettably, been insufficient to enhance the credibility of either the electoral or the democratic process," said Bruce George, special co-ordinator of the OSCE chairman-in-office. 
Some 450 international observers from 43 countries monitored the polls in one of the largest and longest election observation missions in the OSCE's history.

Supporting the allegations of electoral fraud were also exit polls conducted by an American company, Global Strategy, which showed that the opposition had won by a large margin, with the National Movement coming first with 20% and the government block polling only 14% of the vote.

Results

References

Annulled elections
Parliamentary elections in Georgia (country)
Rose Revolution
Georgia
2003 in Georgia (country)
Election and referendum articles with incomplete results